Symmoca caliginella is a moth of the family Autostichidae. It is found in France, Austria and Italy.

The wingspan is 16–19 mm. Adults are dark grey with black dots on the forewings. The hindwings are ash grey.

References

External links
 Images representing  Symmoca caliginella at Consortium for the Barcode of Life

Moths described in 1867
Symmoca
Moths of Europe
Moths of Asia